Duarte de Eça (born 1480) was the 3rd Captain-major of Portuguese Ceylon. Eça was appointed in 1552 under John III of Portugal, he was Captain-major until 1553. He was succeeded by Fernão Carvalho.

References

Bibliography 

Vila-Santa, Nuno, "A trajectória de D. Duarte de Eça: de capitão deposto a capitão de Goa", Actas do Congresso Internacional Pequena Nobreza nos Impérios Ibéricos do Antigo Regime, IICT, 2012.

Captain-majors of Ceilão
16th-century Portuguese people
1480 births
Year of death missing
15th-century Portuguese people